Andre Davon Hutson (born January 12, 1979) is an American former professional basketball player.  Born in Dayton, Ohio, he played as small forward and power forward and he is 2.02 m tall.

High school
Hutson played high-school basketball at Trotwood-Madison High School, in Trotwood, Ohio.

College career
Hutson played college basketball under Tom Izzo at Michigan State University (1997–2001), where he was one of the key players to win the NCAA Championship Title in 2000 against Florida.

Professional career
After his collegiate career, Hutson was a second-round selection by the Milwaukee Bucks in the 2001 NBA Draft. Hutson ended up never playing a game in the NBA, making him one of 8 players selected in that year's draft who never appeared in the league.

Hutson then moved to Italy for the 2001–02 season, signed by Basket Napoli. Then moved to Greece for the 2002–03 season, in January 2003, Hutson signed with Peristeri Athens. Signed for the 2003–04 season by Maroussi Athens. Signed for the 2004–05 season by Makedonikos BC. Then moved to Russia for the 2005–06 season, signed by Ural Great Perm. Then back to Greece for the 2006–07 season, signed by Panionios BC. Then moved to Turkey for the 2007–08 season, signed by Efes Pilsen S.K. Then back to Italy for the 2008–09 season, signed by Virtus Roma.

External links
Euroleague.net Profile

1979 births
Living people
American expatriate basketball people in Greece
American expatriate basketball people in Italy
American expatriate basketball people in Russia
American expatriate basketball people in Turkey
American men's basketball players
Anadolu Efes S.K. players
Basket Napoli players
Basketball players from Dayton, Ohio
Makedonikos B.C. players
Maroussi B.C. players
Michigan State Spartans men's basketball players
Milwaukee Bucks draft picks
Pallacanestro Virtus Roma players
Panionios B.C. players
Peristeri B.C. players
PBC Ural Great players
Power forwards (basketball)